The 1901 Canadian Amateur Hockey League (CAHL) season was the third season of the senior ice hockey league. Teams played an eight-game schedule. The Ottawa Hockey Club was the league champion with a record of seven wins, no losses and a draw. The Montreal Shamrocks lost a Stanley Cup challenge during the season, so Ottawa did not inherit the Stanley Cup. The Club declined to challenge Winnipeg after the season.

League business

Executive 
 George R. James, Montreal (President)
 D. Watson, Quebec (1st Vice-President)
 J. W. Smith, Ottawa ( 2nd Vice-President)
 J. Stafford Bishop, Victorias (Secretary-Treasurer)
 C. Hart (Councillor)

The league adopted travelling expenses of $85 between Ottawa-Montreal, $100 between Montreal-Quebec and $125 between Ottawa-Quebec for the visiting teams to receive from the home team.

The league banned member teams from playing exhibition matches outside the league without league permission.

Exhibition games 
On January 12, the Montreal Victorias played an exhibition against the New York Hockey Club, in New York, losing 2–1.

Regular season

Highlights 

The Ottawa club would win the season, undefeated, with players Sixsmith, Westwick and Pulford starring.

Final standing 

Although Ottawa won the league championship, the Shamrocks had lost their challenge to Winnipeg and Ottawa would not be awarded the Cup. At first, Ottawa was intending to challenge Winnipeg for the Cup, but on February 27, 1901, announced that they would not do so that winter. According to Coleman(1966), Ottawa did not issue a challenge due to the "lateness of the season." The Ottawa Journal as reported in The Globe suggested that the Ottawa club was wise in their decision, as they were in "racked condition in which they are, as a result of the immensely hard exertions put forth by them in all their games this season". The Ottawa Hockey Club did not challenge the following season, either.

Stanley Cup challenges

Shamrocks vs. Winnipeg 

In January 1901, the Winnipeg Victorias of the MHA again challenged the Montreal Shamrocks for the Cup. This time, Winnipeg prevailed, sweeping the best-of-three series with scores of 4–3 and 2–1. Game two was the first overtime game in Cup history with Dan Bain scoring at the four-minute mark of the extra period.

Schedule and results 

† Ottawa clinches league championship.

Player statistics

Goaltending averages 
Note: GP = Games played, GA = Goals against, SO = Shutouts, GAA = Goals against average

Leading scorers

See also 
 1900–01 MHA season
 List of Stanley Cup champions

References

Bibliography

Notes

Canadian Amateur Hockey League seasons
CAHL